Bình Dương is a township of Phù Mỹ District, Bình Định Province, Vietnam.

References

Populated places in Bình Định province
Townships in Vietnam